

Incumbents
Monarch of Scotland
James I of England/VI of Scotland (1567–1625) (as King of Scotland)
Charles I of England and Scotland (1625–1649), Duke of Rothesay, Prince and Great Steward of Scotland, etc.
Charles Stuart, Prince of Wales (1612–1625) (ascended to throne)
Charles James Stuart (1629) (Perinatal mortality)

Events

1620
Witch hunts begin in Scotland.

1621
King James VI and I grants William Alexander of Scotland a royal charter to colonize Acadia, a region that includes part of modern-day Southeastern Canada and the U.S. state of Maine, in an effort to establish a Scottish colonial empire in the New World.
The Parliament of Scotland ratifies the Five Articles of Perth, which are meant to integrate the Church in Scotland with the Anglican Church. This unpopular move by King James will eventually lead to the rise of the Covenanters in Scotland.

1622
June 16 – Scottish Lord Chancellor Alexander Seton, 1st Earl of Dunfermline dies. During the earlier months prior to his death, he has  been in the process of making alterations to Fyvie Castle and the Pinkie House, which become famous modern-day landmarks in Scotland.

1623
 Clan MacDonald kills rival Clan chief Malcolm MacFie, and occupy clan MacFie's Argyll islands. As a result, Clan MacFie is considered "disbanded" from 1623 until 1981.

1624
May 25 – The town of Dunfermline is destroyed by a fire.
Death in Edinburgh of Huguenot calligrapher Esther Inglis.

1625
March 27 – Charles I succeeds to the thrones of England (with Wales) and Scotland.
June 13 – Charles I marries Princess Henrietta Maria of France.

1626
July 5 – Battle of Stralsund occurs in which Holy Roman Commander Albrecht von Wallenstein is defeated by a joint Swedo-Danish force with Scottish assistance which eventually leads to the siege against Stralsund being lifted on August 4.
William Alexander is appointed Secretary for Scotland, an office he will hold until his death in 1640.

1627
Reconstruction of Muchalls Castle in Aberdeenshire completed by Thomas Burnett.

1628
George Heriot's School is established as Heriot's Hospital in Edinburgh.

1629
 William Alexander, 1st Earl of Stirling briefly establishes a Scottish colony at Port Royal, Nova Scotia.
 February 26 – Birth in Dalkeith of Archibald Campbell, 9th Earl of Argyll (executed 1685).

Births

1620
 January 1 – Robert Morison, botanist and taxonomist (died 1683)
 James Dundas, Lord Arniston, politician and judge (died 1679)

Deaths

1626
 James Sempill, courtier and poet (born 1566)

See also
Timeline of Scottish history
List of years in Scotland

References

 
17th century in Scotland